Philipp Wolf (born 15 August 1992) is a German swimmer. He competed in the men's 4 × 100 metre freestyle relay event at the 2016 Summer Olympics.

References

External links
 

1992 births
Living people
German male swimmers
Olympic swimmers of Germany
Swimmers at the 2016 Summer Olympics
Place of birth missing (living people)
German male freestyle swimmers